QDS may refer to
the Semitic triliteral Q-D-Š "sacred"
Quantum digital signature